Lonevågen is a small fjord arm flowing south off of the Osterfjorden in Vestland county, Norway. The fjord cuts into the island of Osterøy in Osterøy Municipality. The village of Lonevåg, the administrative center of Osterøy Municipality, is located at the end of the fjord.

See also
 List of Norwegian fjords

References

Fjords of Vestland
Osterøy